San José (Santa María) is a town and municipality in Catamarca Province in northwestern Argentina.

References

Populated places in Catamarca Province